Hong Kong electoral reform may refer to:

1985 Hong Kong electoral reform
1988 Hong Kong electoral reform
1994 Hong Kong electoral reform
2010 Hong Kong electoral reform
2014–15 Hong Kong electoral reform
2021 Hong Kong electoral reform